Eva Prytz (20 April 1917 – 16 December 1987) was a Norwegian opera soprano.

She was born in Oslo, but took her education in Stockholm, studying under Andrejewa de Skilondz. She was employed by the Royal Swedish Theatre from 1946 to 1967 and also held concerts in  Oslo and several other European cities. She received several decorations, including the Order of Vasa and the St. Olav's Medal.

References

1917 births
1987 deaths
Norwegian expatriates in Sweden
Musicians from Oslo
Recipients of the St. Olav's Medal
Recipients of the Order of Vasa
20th-century Norwegian women opera singers
Norwegian operatic sopranos